The Turkey women's water polo team is a water polo team that represents Turkey at water polo competitions.

Results

European Championship

European Championship Qualification

Mediterranean Games

Current squad
Roster for the 2018 Women's European Water Polo Championship.

Head coach: Hakan Şahbaz

References

 
Women's national water polo teams
National water polo teams in Europe
National water polo teams by country
Water polo